Luc Peters (born 9 October 1992) is a Dutch professional darts player who competes in Professional Darts Corporation events.

At Q-School in 2022, Peters won his Tour Card on the third day of qualifying, by defeating Mario Vandenbogaerde (who would later get a card himself), to get himself a two-year card on the PDC circuit.

He won a Challenge Tour for the first time in 2021 in Niedernhausen, Germany.

Performance timeline 

PDC European Tour

References

External links

1992 births
Living people
Professional Darts Corporation current tour card holders
People from Millingen aan de Rijn
Dutch darts players
Sportspeople from Gelderland